Shara Clevenger Brice is the founder of the Ascension Eagles Cheerleaders in London, England. The program engages in youth diversion and positive character building activities. In 1996, her husband, Jonathan, was assigned to be the vicar of Custom House’s Church of Ascension and she encouraged a group of girls to get involved in cheerleading. The squad now has 130 children and young people aged three to 24, with kids who come from the poorest and most diverse areas in England. Her Ascension Eagles charity sends trained coaches and other volunteers into 30 schools in east London to teach leadership skills, life skills and cheerleading. Brice received an MBE in 2005, was a recipient of 2010 Woman of the Year "You Can" Award, and was an Olympic torchbearer in 2012.

References

Living people
People from West Ham
Social workers
Members of the Order of the British Empire
1969 births